Yoo Ji-No (born November 6, 1989) is a South Korean football player who plays for Suwon FC.

Career
Yoo joined Busan IPark from Jeonnam Dragons in 2013. A versatile defender or midfielder, Yoo became a regular at right wing-back for Busan during the 2014 season. His first professional goal was a late header against Gwangju FC on 24 April 2015, securing a 1–0 victory. Yoo joined Suwon City following Busan IPark's relegation from the K League Classic.

Club career statistics 
Correct as of 6 December 2015

External links
 

1989 births
Living people
Association football fullbacks
South Korean footballers
Jeonnam Dragons players
Seongnam FC players
Busan IPark players
Suwon FC players
K League 1 players
Footballers from Seoul